Maltenglish, also known as Manglish, Minglish, Maltese English,  or  refers to the phenomenon of code-switching between Maltese, a Semitic language derived from late medieval Sicilian Arabic with Romance superstrata, and English, an Indo-European Germanic language.

Both Maltese and English are official languages in Malta, and about 88% of the Maltese people can speak English as a second language. Various Maltese social groups switch back and forth between the two languages, or macaronically mix lexical aspects of Maltese and English while engaging in informal conversation or writing.

The term Maltenglish is first recorded in 2007. Other colloquial portmanteau words include (chronologically): Minglish (2006), Malglish (2016), and Manglish (2016).

Maltenglish can also refer to English loanwords in the Maltese language.

Prevalence
Recent studies have shown that code-switching is practiced by a third of the population in everyday discourse.

The most common areas where code-switching occurs is in part of the Northern Harbour District, mainly in the towns of Sliema, St. Julian's, Pembroke, Swieqi, Madliena, San Ġwann and Kappara.

Examples

While code switching in English sentences is most predominant in the Northern Harbour District, code switching in a Maltese sentence is much more common throughout the country. This is usually because the Maltese word is not so well known or used. Examples include:

See also
 Languages of Malta
 Llanito
 Żejtun dialect
 Qormi dialect

References

External links
Ignasi Badia i Capdevila, "A view of the linguistic situation in Malta", Noves SL: Revista de Sociolingüística (2004)
YouTube video on tal-pepé Maltese people with examples of Maltenglish
Maltinglish - A dictionary of literal and silly Maltese to English translations

Code-switching
Macaronic forms of English
Maltese language